Walter Dennis Myers Jr. (June 9, 1914 – June 2, 1967) was an American lawyer, politician, and judge who served as a justice of the Indiana Supreme Court from January 7, 1963 until his death on June 2, 1967.

Biography
Myers was born in Indianapolis, Indiana. He was the son of Walter Dennis Myers and Katherine Lyons. Myers Sr., originally from Perry County, Pennsylvania, was a First World War veteran and a Democratic politician who served in the Indiana House of Representatives and as U.S. Assistant Postmaster General from 1940 to 1953 in the administrations of Franklin Roosevelt and Harry Truman.

Myers graduated from Shortridge High School, where he ran for class president. Myers then attended Yale University in New Haven, Connecticut. He received his first degree from Yale in 1935. He then attended Yale Law School, receiving his law degree in 1938.

Myers returned to Indianapolis, opening a legal practice in 1939. Beginning in 1943, Myers began teaching at Butler University, lecturing on business law.

In 1958, Myers was elected as judge of the Indiana Appellate Court, serving in the position until 1962.

Myers was a member of the Indiana State Bar Association. He was a member of the Association's Committee on Illegal Practice of Law and Grievances.

In 1963, Myers became a justice of the Indiana Supreme Court, succeeding Justice Arch Bobbitt. Myers died in office and was succeeded by Justice David Lewis.

References

1914 births
1967 deaths
People from Indianapolis
Shortridge High School alumni
Yale University alumni
Yale Law School alumni
Justices of the Indiana Supreme Court
American judges
Indiana Democrats